Diego Quiroga (born 9 February 1961) is an Ecuadorian swimmer. He competed in two events at the 1980 Summer Olympics.

References

1961 births
Living people
Ecuadorian male swimmers
Olympic swimmers of Ecuador
Swimmers at the 1980 Summer Olympics
Pan American Games competitors for Ecuador
Swimmers at the 1979 Pan American Games
Place of birth missing (living people)
20th-century Ecuadorian people